Mèo da Siena (active 1310–1333) was an Italian painter active in Umbria in a late-Gothic style.

He is also known as Bartolomeo Guarnieri or Meo da Guido da Siena. He may be the son of a painter, Guido Guarnieri or Gratiani or Graziani of Siena, who settled in Perugia in 1319.

He was influenced by Duccio, and is known for a few works in Umbria, including a polyptych of the Virgin and Saints in the Galleria Nazionale of Perugia. Attributed to Meo or his studio are also a triptych in the Museum of the Duomo of Perugia and a polyptych originally in the church of San Pietro

References

Further reading
Meo di Guido da Siena biography with images

14th-century Italian painters
Italian male painters
Umbrian painters
Painters from Siena
Gothic painters